Jonathan Berwyn Jones (born 27 October 1978) is a Welsh footballer who played as a forward in the Football League for Chester City.

References

Living people
Chester City F.C. players
Association football forwards
The New Saints F.C. players
English Football League players
1978 births
Footballers from Wrexham
Welsh footballers